The letter Ƥ (minuscule: ƥ), called P with hook, is a letter of the Latin alphabet based on the letter p. It is used in some alphabets of African languages such as Serer.

The minuscule ƥ was formerly used in the International Phonetic Alphabet to represent a voiceless bilabial implosive. It was withdrawn in 1993.

The minuscule variant resembles a lowercase thorn (þ)

Computer encoding
The majuscule and the minuscule are located at U+01A4 and U+01A5 in Unicode, respectively.

Latin letters with diacritics
Phonetic transcription symbols